Tetragnatha elongata, the elongate stilt spider, is a spider in the family Tetragnathidae.

Distribution
Tetragnatha elongata is commonly found in North and Central America, including Cuba and Jamaica.

References

Tetragnathidae
Spiders of North America
Spiders of Central America
Spiders described in 1841